Balconi may refer to:

 Balconi (surname), an Italian surname
 Dolciaria Balconi,  Italian company specialized in sponge cake

See also 

 Balcony (disambiguation)